Dr. Gurupadappa Sanganabasappa Nagamarapalli (11 November 1942 – 17 November 2015) was an Indian veteran politician and businessman who served as the Minister of Home Affairs of Karnataka from  15 April 1989 to 21 April 1989. He was also Minister of Forest and Ecology of Karnataka from 1996 to 1999 and again from 2005 to 2006. He was the six term Member of the Karnataka Legislative Assembly (four terms from the Aurad) (two terms from the Bidar North Constituency).

Dr.Gurupadappa Nagamarapalli  has played a pivotal role in establishing the District Cooperative Central Bank Bidar to international fame. The concept of bringing the weaker section of the society to the mainstream through credit linking them by SHG has been acclaimed by the whole nation and international agencies. The Bidar DCCB has been a model of learning for the rural lending and it has been named as the Bidar Model of SHG all through the globe. Bankers, NGO's and other stakeholders from every part of the country and globe visit Bidar DCCB to learn this concept of lending to replicate it at their institution. His legacy has been carried out by his eldest son Sri. Umakanth Nagamarapalli in the field of Cooperative and Micro Credit Lending to the higher level.

For his contribution in the field of Cooperative and Micro Credit Lending he has been honored with a doctorate by Gulbarga University Kalburgi.

References 

1942 births
2015 deaths
Karnataka politicians
Karnataka MLAs 1994–1999
Janata Party politicians
Janata Dal politicians
Indian National Congress politicians
Karnataka Janata Paksha politicians
Bharatiya Janata Party politicians from Karnataka
People from Bidar
Indian National Congress politicians from Karnataka